Colonel Satsangi's Kiran Memorial Public School is a senior secondary school established in 1986 by Col P S Satsangi(VSM). It is affiliated to the Central Board of Secondary Education.  CSKM Public School offers residential, long hours day boarding, and month end/week end home boarding schooling programmes. It combines the qualities of the Public School System with the Indian Gurukul System.

Location
The CSKM School occupies a sprawling area of 15 acres amidst the scenic Aravalli hills at Satbari, South Delhi, New Delhi. Located two kilometres off the Mehrauli - Chattarpur - Bhatti Mines Road, the school is 13 to 16 km away from Nizamuddin, New Delhi and Delhi railway stations and 10 to 13 km away from the domestic and international airports. The school is 4 km from the famous Chattarpur Temple, 7 km from Qutub Minar and 5 km from IGNOU (Indira Gandhi National Open University).

History
The CSKM Public School was established in 1986 by Late Col Prem Saran Satsangi, VSM, who was a pioneer in school education and was awarded the Vishisht Sewa Medal for his outstanding services in education.

CSKM rights
Right Thought

Right Attitude

Right Speech

Right Conduct

Right Mindfulness

Right Effort

Right View

And You Decide What Is Right

But

Be Prepared To Take Responsibility

For Yourself

School flag 
The school flag have three colours: steel grey, blood red and navy blue

Steel grey colour signifies Determination and Endurance, blood red colour represents Sacrifice in Devotion to Duty, navy blue colour symbolises the path of Character and Thought.

School crest and motto 
'Busy Bee Pleasure' symbolizes the ever-busy bee which derives pleasure from its work, picking the best nectar from flowers and producing the best honey.

Streams 
The school offers three streams: Science, Commerce and Humanities. The subjects offered in the senior secondary classes are: English, Physics, Chemistry, Mathematics, Biology, Accountancy, Economics, Business Studies, Political Science, Sociology, History, Psychology, Informatics Practices, Painting, Physical Education.

Infrastructure
The school is equipped with activity rooms, auditorium, AV room, banquet hall, library, Computer Science labs, counselling centre, dining hall, internet, language labs, lecture theaters, open air theaters, Psychology lab, reference library, science laboratory, self-learning centre, seminar halls, Smart classes, staff rooms, basketball courts, badminton courts, lawn Tennis courts, cricket ground, football ground, and table tennis courts.

The school has a boarding facility for both boys and girls and most of the teachers stay in the campus to take care of the students all day.

Session and timings 
The school timings are from morning 8:30 am to 4:20 pm.

The school follows the CBSE academic year which starts from 1 April to 31 March

Academics 

 IT Enabled Labs
 Atal Tinkering lab 
 Sciences 
 Computers 
 Language 
 French 
 Maths 
 Smart Classes 
 Arts 
 Commerce
 24 hours Residential Faculty Care - PhDs, gold medalists and qualified staff 
 100% scholarship to the meritorious 
 Delhi Domicile for Engineering, Medical & Delhi University admission

Sports 

 4 basketball courts 
 3 tennis courts 
 2 volleyball courts 
 2 badminton courts 
 Cricket 
 Football fields 
 Athletic track 
 Yoga 
 MultiGym 
 Table tennis 
 Skating 
 Taekwondo 
 Swimming pool 
 Splash pool 
 Specialised coaching by Peninsula Tennis Academy

Personality development 

 Psychologist, Special Educator & Counsellor for Personality Assessment, Intervention and Development 
 Child Guidance, Career Counselling 
 Public speaking skills
 Hobbies
 Paper recycling 
 Robotics 
 Dance 
 Flute and drum Band 
 Music 
 Photography 
 Art and craft 
 Story writing 
 Helen O’ Grady International Theater 
 Vedic maths and abacus

Well-being 
 Nearest main road 2 km away 
 Surrounded by farms on 3 sides 
 Adjacent to Asola Wildlife Sanctuary 
 Huge campus adjacent to Asola Wildlife Sanctuary 
 Hot meals in dining hall 
 Eco club 
 300+ trees
 Medical Room
 24 Hours ambulance facility 
 Referrals to South Delhi Doctors and hospitals

Secure environment 

 24 x 7 CCTV surveillance  
 GPS enabled transport with CCTV 
 Real time alert through SMS

Hostel / boarding facility 

 Separate hostel facilities for boys and girls with 24 hour supervision by Wardens and Counselors.
 Lady Wardens, Games teachers and Counselors, for the girls.
 Food is served in the dining hall.
 24 – hours medical supervision under nurses and resident doctor.
 School being a secular set up, festivals of all religions are celebrated.

Awards and recognitions 
 International Dimension In Schools Award 2022-25 by British Council
 Gandhi Smriti Samman Award
 Best Boarding school in India - India Education Award
 India’s Best Result Oriented School - National Education Excellence Award 
 Top 3 Boarding School in Delhi - Three Best Rated 
 Most Promising Boarding School - The Education Excellence Awards 
 Zonal Level Science Drama (First Prize) 
 Zonal Level Maths Exhibition (First Prize) 
 Zonal Overall Championship trophy in Games and Sports in 2017-18, 2018-19, 2019-20 & 2022-23

Notable people
Mr Sunil Mansingh - Journalist, Times of India
Mr Hitender Hari - Judge
Ms Priya Shekhar - Judge
Dr Khushboo Singh - Actor
Mr Niraj Bahadur Shahi - Additional Inspector General of Police, Nepal
Mr Naresh Mohan Jha, Director (Budget) - Fiscal Responsibility and Budget Management Act, 2003
Saurabh Raj Jain - TV and film actor
Ved Pal - Delhi Councillor
Dr Manoj Kumar - Director Law Firm Hammurabi and Solomon
Mr Sanjay Kumar - District Magistrate
Mr Amrit Abhijat - Joint secretary, Ministry of Housing and Urban Affairs at Government of India

CBSE Delhi
Boarding schools in Delhi